Frenchville may refer to:

Australia 

 Frenchville, Queensland, a suburb in the city of Rockhampton

United States 
Frenchville, Maine
Frenchville, New York
Frenchville, Pennsylvania
Frenchville, Wisconsin